Balbus is Latin for "stammerer", and may refer to:

 Quintus Lucilius Balbus (fl. 100 BC), Stoic philosopher mentioned in the works of Cicero
 Marcus Atius Balbus, grandfather of the Roman emperor Augustus
 Lucius Cornelius Balbus (consul 40 BC)
 Lucius Cornelius Balbus (proconsul)
 Theatre of Balbus, built by Lucius Cornelius Balbus (proconsul)
 Johannes Balbus (died  1298), Italian lexicographer
 Steven Balbus, Savilian Professor of Astronomy, Oxford University
 Balbus, a character in The Apple Cart by George Bernard Shaw
 Balbus, a character in the Epistle to Dr Arbuthnot
 Mixophyes balbus, "Stuttering Frog" species
 ST Balbus, a Nigerian Government tugboat

See also

 
 Baldus
 Bulbus (genus), a genus of predatory sea snails
 Stutter (disambiguation)
 Stammer (disambiguation)

bg:Луций Корнелий Балб